Jürgen Schmitt alias Schmitti (born 5 November 1949 in Bonn) is a German painter, photographer, and as "Schmitti", a composer, lyricist and Schlager-singer. He lives and works in the village of Scheven (population ca. 560) (Kall, North Rhine-Westphalia) and there he has his studios. Schmitt studied from 1970 to 1976 at the Art Academy in Düsseldorf under Professor Joseph Beuys and Professor Irmin Kamp and he was appointed in 1975 for his artistic achievements "Meister Schüler". He had many exhibitions in Germany and abroad.

Discography

Singles 
Source:
 1997: Let's Rock im Karneval
 2006: Wooly Bully – Volle Pulle
 2007: Schatz – Mer fiere Fastelovend
 2008: Du, Du liegst mir im Herzen
 2008: Immer wenn ich traurig bin, trink ich einen Korn
 2008: Himmlisch jeck
 2009: En Kölle jebütz
 2009: Weihnachten
 2009: Jetzt geht es los
 2009: Laola
 2010: Ganz schön blau
 2010: Die Sonne und Du
 2010: Jetzt lass uns mal schunkeln
 2011: Du bist meine Nummer 1
 2011: Mallorca Ole Ola
 2011: Ein bisschen Spaß muss sein
 2012: Küss mich einmal, küss mich zweimal, feat. Helga Brauer
 2012: En Kölle un am Zuckerhot (Mottolied)
 2013: 1000 Küsse
 2013: Die geile Raupe Nimmersatt
 2014: Überall blühen Rosen Gilbert-Becaud-Coverversion & Sweety Peter Kraus-Coverversion
 2014: Fußball-Deutschland stark wie nie
 2014: D’r Zoch kütt
 2015: Mallorca ist so schön, Coverversion, Ballermann-Hit nach Frank Zanders Marlene
 2016: Jetzt ist es aus / (Unplugged and acoustic)
 2016 Ein Prosit der Gemütlichkeit Remix und Geburtstagsständchen

Albums 
 2010: Volle Pulle! Die Mallorca- und Karneval-Party

References

External links 
 Official Website (artist)
 Schmitti's official Website

20th-century German painters
20th-century German male artists
German male painters
21st-century German painters
21st-century German male artists
Photographers from North Rhine-Westphalia
German male singers
German composers
1949 births
Living people